The Loire Departmental Council (French: Conseil départemental de la Loire) is the deliberative assembly of the Loire department. 
It consists of 42 members (departmental councilors) elected for a 6-years term and its headquarters are in Saint-Étienne, capital of the department.

The president  
The president of the Departmental Council is currently Georges Ziegler (UDI).

The councillors  
The Departemental Council consists of 42 councillors (conseillers départementaux) who come from the 21 cantons of Loire. They are elected for a 6-years term.

See also  
 Loire 
 Departmental council (France)

External links 
  Loire Departemental Council

Loire (department)
Departmental councils (France)